The Eureka Community Hall is a site on the National Register of Historic Places located in  Eureka, Montana.  It was added to the Register on October 18, 1985.

It is a one-story log structure built in 1942 with support of the Works Project Administration.

Its 1983 NRHP nomination asserts:The Eureka Community hall is of exceptional local historical and architectural significance because it is the primary building in this remote, northwestern Montana community that represents the conscious decision of the community to build a structure that serves both its social needs and as an expression of the citizens' cultural values. This finely detailed, Rustic Style, log building stands in a commanding position on a hill overlooking the commercial district of the small northwestern Montana town of Eureka. It is the most substantial and well crafted building in Eureka and is a major visual component of this community's identity.

References

Event venues on the National Register of Historic Places in Montana
National Register of Historic Places in Lincoln County, Montana
Buildings and structures completed in 1942
Log buildings and structures on the National Register of Historic Places in Montana
Works Progress Administration in Montana
1942 establishments in Montana
Rustic architecture in Montana
Community centers in Montana